Oyón Province is a province of the Lima Region in Peru. It measures . The capital of the province is the city of Oyón.

Geography 
The Rawra mountain range and the Rumi Cruz mountain range traverse the province. Some of the highest peaks of the province are listed below:

Political division 
The province is divided into six districts, which are:

See also 
 Chawpiqucha

References 

Provinces of the Lima Region